Jayne MacDonald (16 August 196026 June 1977) was a 16-year-old shop assistant who was murdered on 26 June 1977 by Peter Sutcliffe, commonly known as 'The Yorkshire Ripper'. She was his youngest known murder victim, although not his youngest victim (he later confessed to attacking 14-year old Tracy Browne two years earlier). Her death led to widespread coverage of the murders, public furor and rising anger amongst women.

Early life
Jayne Michelle MacDonald, born in Leeds in 1960, was the second child of Wilfred MacDonald (a railwayman) and his wife Irene. She had two half-sisters - Carole and Janet (born 1957) - from her mother's first marriage, and siblings Debra (born 1961) and Ian (born 1964). Carole married Victor in 1964 and moved with him to Johannesburg, South Africa with Janet remaining with her mother and half-siblings.

MacDonald had recently left Allerton High School and since April 1977 had been working as a shop assistant in the shoe department at Grandways supermarket. She was described in police reports as being  with shoulder-length brown hair. She was a Bay City Rollers fan and enjoyed dancing and roller skating.

Murder
On 25 June 1977, MacDonald went to meet friends at the Hofbrauhaus, a German-style bierkeller in Leeds. She missed the last bus home and went back to her friends house to wait for his sister to bring her home. After 45 minutes so, she ended up walking home. She was attacked by Peter Sutcliffe in Reginald Street in Leeds at around 2am.

Her body was discovered the following morning at 9.45am by children in the playground between Reginald Terrace and Reginald Street in Chapeltown. A post mortem exam was carried out by the Home Office pathologist Professor David Gee. The extent of her injuries was not revealed at the time by police although it was subsequently revealed she had been hit on the head three times with a hammer and had been stabbed in the chest and back. A broken bottle was found embedded in her chest.

MacDonald was buried in Harehills Cemetery, Leeds, West Yorkshire on 20 December 1977.

Aftermath of murder

Change of perception
MacDonald's death marked a change in the tide of the investigation into the Yorkshire Ripper murders - primarily because of her youth and innocence. She was said to be his first "non-prostitute" murder victim, his youngest murder victim and his fifth known murder victim. The police described her as a “respectable young girl” who was a chance victim. The Byford Report was critical of this point, noting that the murder of Jayne MacDonald elicited a more sympathetic response from both the public and the press, and arguing that police should not have assumed that Peter Sutcliffe "wrongly identified MacDonald as a prostitute".

MacDonald's family lived on the same street as one of Sutcliffe's earlier victims, Wilma McCann, and they strenuously objected to the way victims were divided into categories. MacDonald's sister Debra said: "I do remember Mum and Dad feeling really angry about that - the division of victims into good women and bad. It was terrible and none of us saw it that way."

In a public appeal, Irene MacDonald commented: "How many more must die before people wake up and realize it could happen to someone they love? I feel that if (the victims) had all been Sunday school teachers, the public would have come forward with clues and the man would have been found by now."

Journalist Henry Matthews commented: “Prior to that point, the fear, if you like, had been exclusively felt by working prostitutes. But from Jayne McDonald on there was this feeling that no woman was safe.” After MacDonald's murder there was a public outcry and the next day West Yorkshire Police began to circulate information about the murders of Jayne MacDonald, along with that of Wilma McCann, Emily Jackson, Patricia Atkinson and Irene Richardson. This marked the point at which the attacks were seen as "something truly heinous", and there was significant, systematic urgency to catch the Yorkshire Ripper.

Reclaim the Night Movement
MacDonald's murder changed the police and press's perception of the Yorkshire Ripper murders (later discovered to be by Peter Sutcliffe) and resulted in public furore and increasing anger amongst women. The police reaction led to the Reclaim the Night movement being formed in 1977.

Women - particularly in Leeds and the North of England - felt the police response to the Yorkshire Ripper murders was slow and that the press had barely reported on them until MacDonald's murder. Although her murder led to more coverage, the police responded by telling women not to go out at night, effectively putting them under curfew. Feminists and a variety of student and women’s groups were angered by this response, as well as by the sensationalizing of the serial murders. This led to the Leeds Revolutionary Feminist Group calling for women to march in cities across the UK on the night of 12 November 1977 against rape and for a woman’s right to walk without fear at night.

Sutcliffe's testimony
When Sutcliffe was apprehended in 1981 he admitted to feeling regret about MacDonald's killing. He said he thought she was a prostitute because she was walking through a red-light district in the early hours of the morning, saying: "I felt like someone inhuman and I realised that it was a devil driving me against my will and that I was a beast".

Family's reaction
Irene MacDonald was reported to have said that she wished Sutcliffe was going to the gallows. "I hope other prisoners have the decency to make every minute he is inside a living hell for him," she said. On 5 March 1982, Irene MacDonald made legal history when a High Court registrar in Leeds awarded her damages of £6,722 against Peter Sutcliffe for the death of her daughter.

Wilfred MacDonald, who had to identify Jayne's body, died in 1979 at the age of 60. He was buried with her.

References

1977 in England
1977 murders in the United Kingdom
1970s in Leeds
Crime in Leeds
June 1977 crimes
June 1977 events in the United Kingdom
Murder in West Yorkshire
Stabbing attacks in England
Violence against women in England
Peter Sutcliffe victims
Murdered English children